The Hawaii Rainbow Warriors football statistical leaders are individual statistical leaders of the Hawaii Rainbow Warriors football program in various categories, including passing, rushing, receiving, total offense, defensive stats, and kicking. Within those areas, the lists identify single-game, Single season and career leaders. The Rainbow Warriors represent the University of Hawaii at Manoa in the NCAA's Mountain West Conference (MW).

Although Hawaii began competing in intercollegiate football in 1909, the school's official record book considers the "modern era" to have begun in 1968. Records from before this year are often incomplete and inconsistent, and they are generally not included in these lists.

These lists are dominated by more recent players for several reasons:
 Since 1968, college football seasons have increased from 10 games to 11 and then 12 games in length. Additionally, the NCAA allows Hawaii to play one more game each season than institutions located on the U.S. mainland, presumably as compensation for the costs required to travel to games on the mainland. In turn, this means that a typical Hawaii season now consists of 13 regular-season games, not counting possible conference championship games or bowl appearances.
 The NCAA didn't allow freshmen to play varsity football until 1972 (with the exception of the World War II years), allowing players to have four-year careers.
 Bowl games only began counting toward single-season and career statistics in 2002. The Rainbow Warriors have played in 10 bowl games since then.
 The Rainbow Warriors also played in the 2019 MW Championship Game, giving players in that season yet another game to accumulate statistics.

These lists are updated through the end of the 2019 season. The Hawaii 2019 Media Guide does not list a top 10 for every statistic, sometimes only listing a single leader.

Passing

Passing yards

Passing touchdowns

Rushing

Rushing yards

Rushing touchdowns

Receiving

Receptions

Receiving yards

Receiving touchdowns

Total offense
Total offense is the sum of passing and rushing statistics. It does not include receiving or returns.

Total offense yards

Touchdowns responsible for
"Touchdowns responsible for" is the official NCAA term for combined rushing and passing touchdowns. It does not include receiving or returns.

Defense

Interceptions

Tackles

Sacks

Kicking

Field goals made

Field goal percentage

References

Lists of college football statistical leaders by team